Cardamom Town is a theme park located within the Kristiansand Zoo in Kristiansand, Norway, based on the popular Norwegian children's book When the Robbers Came to Cardamom Town by Thorbjørn Egner.

The theme park, which opened in 1991, was made to look exactly like it looks in the original illustrations in the book. Thorbjørn Egner got to see the theme park while it was under construction, but did not live long enough to see it completed. 

The theme park comprises 33 houses, eight of which are rental properties. During the summer actors in the park portray the residents of the fictional town. In addition the visitors of the theme park can see the different main characters in the book: Commissioner Bastian and Aunt Sophia, as well as the three robbers, Kasper, Jesper and Jonathan. The theme park has a working tram made to look like the one in the book and is operated by an actor who portrays the character of tram conductor Syversen. The theme park also has a functioning post office, which uses the postal code "4609 Cardamom Town".

The most notable houses in the Cardamom Town theme park 
 Tobias' Tower
 Aunt Sophie's House
 Chief Bastian's House
 The town prison
 The robbers' house

Gallery

See also 
 When the Robbers Came to Cardamom Town

External links 

 Official website - contains a flash video presentation of the Cardamom Town theme park.

__noTOC__

Kristiansand Zoo and Amusement Park
Buildings and structures in Agder
Tourist attractions in Agder